Trigonothops is a genus of beetles in the family Carabidae, containing the following species:

 Trigonothops anchoralis (Sloane, 1917) 
 Trigonothops australis (Erichson, 1842) 
 Trigonothops collaris (Blackburn, 1901) 
 Trigonothops dimidiatus Chaudoir, 1877 
 Trigonothops euplenes (Darlington, 1968) 
 Trigonothops farinae (Blackburn, 1901) 
 Trigonothops fasciatus W.J.Macleay, 1888 
 Trigonothops flavofasciatus Chaudoir, 1877 
 Trigonothops humeralis (W.J.Macleay, 1888) 
 Trigonothops lateralis Darlington, 1968 
 Trigonothops longiplaga Chaudoir, 1877 
 Trigonothops mastersii (W. J.Macleay, 1871) 
 Trigonothops meyeri Ball & Hilchie, 1983 
 Trigonothops nigricollis W.J.Macleay, 1864 
 Trigonothops occidentalis Blackburn, 1892 
 Trigonothops ornatus W.J.Macleay, 1888 
 Trigonothops pacificus (Erichson, 1842) 
 Trigonothops pallidicollis W.J.Macleay, 1864 
 Trigonothops pallidior W.J.Macleay, 1888 
 Trigonothops parviceps (Sloane, 1923) 
 Trigonothops pauper (Blackburn, 1901) 
 Trigonothops pescotti (Oke, 1851) 
 Trigonothops semivittatus (W.J.Macleay, 1888) 
 Trigonothops vittipennis Sloane in Lea, 1908

References

Lebiinae